East Indiaman was a general name for any sailing ship operating under charter or licence to any of the East India trading companies of the major European trading powers of the 17th through the 19th centuries. The term is used to refer to vessels belonging to the Austrian, Danish, Dutch, English, French, Portuguese, or Swedish companies.

Some of the East Indiamen chartered by the British East India Company were known as "tea clippers".

In Britain, the East India Company held a monopoly granted to it by Queen Elizabeth I of England in 1600 for all English trade between the Cape of Good Hope and Cape Horn. This grant was progressively restricted during the late 18th and early 19th centuries, until the monopoly was lost in 1834. English (later British) East Indiamen usually ran between England, the Cape of Good Hope and India, where their primary destinations were the ports of Bombay, Madras and Calcutta. The Indiamen often continued on to China before returning to England via the Cape of Good Hope and Saint Helena. When the company lost its monopoly, the ships of this design were sold off. A smaller, faster ship known as a Blackwall Frigate was built for the trade as the need to carry heavy armaments declined.

Description of the sailing vessels and the trade

East Indiamen vessels carried both passengers and goods, and were armed to defend themselves against pirates. Initially, the East Indiamen were built to carry as much cargo as possible, rather than for speed of sailing. The British East India Company had a monopoly on trade with India and China, supporting that design.

East Indiamen were the largest merchant ships regularly built during the late 18th and early 19th centuries, generally measuring between 1100 and 1400 tons burthen (bm). Two of the largest were the Earl of Mansfield and Lascelles being built at Deptford in 1795. The Royal Navy purchased both, converted them to 56-gun fourth rates, and renamed them Weymouth and Madras respectively.  They measured 1426 tons (bm) on dimensions of approximately 175 feet overall length of hull, 144 feet keel, 43 feet beam, 17 feet draft.

In England, Queen Elizabeth I granted an exclusive right to the trade to the East India Company in 1600, a monopoly which lasted until 1834. The company grew to encompass more than the trade between England and India, but the ships described in this article are the type used in the 17th to the early 19th centuries to carry the trade.

During the wars with France
During the French Revolutionary and Napoleonic Wars they were often painted to resemble warships; an attacker could not be sure if gunports were real or merely paint, and some Indiamen carried sizable armaments. The Royal Navy acquired several East Indiamen, turning them into fourth rates (e.g., HMS Weymouth and HMS Madras, described above), maintaining the confusion for military ships seeking merchant ships as prizes of war. In some cases the East Indiamen successfully fought off attacks by the French. One of the most celebrated of these incidents occurred in 1804, when a fleet of East Indiamen and other merchant vessels under Commodore Nathaniel Dance successfully fought off a marauding squadron commanded by Admiral Linois in the Indian Ocean in the Battle of Pulo Aura.

Due to the need to carry heavy cannon, the hull of the East Indiamen – in common with most warships of the time – was much wider at the waterline than at the upper deck, so that guns carried on the upper deck were closer to the centre-line to aid stability. This is known as tumblehome. The ships normally had two complete decks for accommodation within the hull and a raised poop deck. The poop deck and the deck below it were lit with square-windowed galleries at the stern. To support the weight of the galleries, the hull lines towards the stern were full. Later ships built without this feature tended to sail faster, which put the East Indiamen at a commercial disadvantage once the need for heavy armament passed.

Ships for the India-China trade

According to historian Fernand Braudel, some of the finest and largest Indiamen of the late 18th and early 19th centuries were built in India, making use of Indian shipbuilding techniques and crewed by Indians, their hulls of Indian teak being especially suitable for local waters. These ships were used for the China run. Until the coming of steamships, these Indian-built ships were relied upon almost exclusively by the British in the eastern seas. None sailed to Europe and they were banned from English ports. Many hundreds of Indian-built Indiamen were built for the British, along with other ships, including warships. Notable among them were Surat Castle (1791), a 1,000-ton (bm) ship with a crew of 150, Lowjee Family, of 800 tons (bm) and a crew of 125, and Shampinder (1802), of 1,300 tons (bm).

Notable ships

Another significant East Indiaman in this period was the 1176-ton (bm) Warley that John Perry built at his Blackwall Yard in 1788, and which the Royal Navy bought in 1795 and renamed . In 1803 she was employed as a transport to establish a settlement at Port Phillip in Australia, later shifted to the site of current-day Hobart, Tasmania by an accompanying ship, the Ocean. French forces captured Calcutta in 1805 off the Isles of Scilly. She grounded at the Battle of the Basque Roads in 1809, and was burned by a British boarding party after her French crew had abandoned her.

The 1200-ton (bm) Arniston was likewise employed by the Royal Navy as a troop transport between England and Ceylon. In 1815, she was wrecked near Cape Agulhas with the loss of 372 lives after a navigation error that was caused by inaccurate dead reckoning and the lack of a marine chronometer with which to calculate her longitude.

End of the era of East Indiamen sailing ships

With the progressive restriction of the monopoly of the British East India Company the desire to build such large armed ships for commercial use waned, and during the late 1830s a smaller, faster ship known as a Blackwall Frigate was built for the premium end of the India and China trades. The last of the East Indiamen was reputed to be the Java (1813–1939) that became a coal hulk, then was broken up.

A ship named Lalla Rookh, involved in an incident in November 1850 off Worthing, West Sussex, in which many local men died after their rescue boat capsized, was described as an East Indiaman bringing sugar and rum from Pernambuco, Brazil.

In literature
The Battle of Pulo Aura is featured in Patrick O'Brian's novel HMS Surprise, with French Admiral Linois in pursuit of a large fleet of East Indiamen. In the novel, HMS Surprise under Captain Aubrey organizes the merchantmen to defeat Linois and his squadron. In history, all the ships that defeated the French squadron were merchantmen.

In the Aubrey–Maturin series, East Indiamen are involved in many of the novels, including the second set in the Peace of Amiens, where some of the sailors took positions on East Indiamen. In other of the novels, Aubrey intercepts enemy vessels that interfere with the merchant ships, earning their gratitude.

Stuart Turton's 2020 novel The Devil and the Dark Water is mostly set on a Dutch Indiaman in 1634.

Examples of Indiamen

Sailing replicas
Several East Indiamen have been reconstructed in recent decades. Some of these are (semi) permanently moored and can be visited as part of a museum collection.

In other media
The 2018 video game Return of the Obra Dinn features an East Indiaman as the fictional vessel, with gameplay requiring players to thoroughly explore a 3D model of the ship and observe its crew's activities.

Empire: Total War features Indiaman as the primary Trading Ship for the European, Indian as well as the United States faction in game. Players will move one or many of these ships to "trade nodes" in West or East Africa, Brazil or the East Indies to gain significant trade profit.

See also
Armed merchantman
Chinaman (ship), a ship used to transport colonial goods from China
Guineaman, a ship used to transport slaves from the region of Guinea
West Indiaman, a ship used to transport colonial goods from the West Indies

References

External links

The East India Company
The East Indiaman Gotheborg project
The East Indiaman Project Gutenberg

Ship types
Age of Sail
Merchant ships
Tall ships